Ulrich Dietz (born 25 January 1958 in Pforzheim) is a German Manager. He used to be the CEO of GFT Technologies SE.

Career
Ulrich Dietz studied mechanical engineering and product engineering at the universities of Reutlingen and of Furtwangen and graduated as a certified engineer.

The GFT (Gesellschaft für Technologietransfer) was founded on March 19, 1987, by Prof. Dr.-Ing. Schönemann, the sole shareholder at that time.

The company name derives from the name TZI (Transferzentrum für Informationstechnologie, Steinbeis-Stiftung), where Prof. Dr.-Ing. Michael Schoenemann had previously been the director, and which he founded in 1985.

In 1999, Dietz took GFT public, listing it on the German stock exchange. Since then, Ulrich Dietz has been CEO of GFT Technologies AG.
In the years that followed he has continued to expand the company, taking it to an international level. Under his leadership, the GFT Group currently employs around  4,493  full-time and around 1,500 freelance employees at locations in 11 countries. Dietz holds 26.3% of all GFT shares.

In 2003, Ulrich Dietz became a member of the Presiding Committee of BITKOM (the German Association for Information Technology, Telecommunications and New Media).
In this role, he has outsized responsibility for the promotion and the expansion of international relations in the German IT industry. Furthermore, he is a member of the task force that represents "IT in small and medium-sized companies" within the scope of the federal government's National IT Summit. The task force's main aim is to improve IT availability for small and medium-sized companies, as well as advance the potential for further education. Since March 2010, Ulrich Dietz has been Speaker of the committee for IT/ICT of the Eastern European Economic Relations by the German Government.

In 2011 Ulrich Dietz initiated the innovation platform CODE n.

Committees

Ulrich Dietz is a member of the following boards:
 
 Member of the Presiding Committee of BITKOM (the German Association for Information Technology, Telecommunications and New Media)
 Speaker of the committee for IT/ICT of the Eastern European Economic Relations by the German Government
 Member of the task force "IT in small and medium-sized companies" within the scope of the federal government's National IT Summit
 Advisory Board of Deutsche Bank AG, Stuttgart
 Chairman of the Advisory Board bw-i (Baden-Württemberg International)

Bibliography
 Dietz, Ulrich: The new New. DISTANZ Verlag, Wuppertal 2010, . In English and German

External links
 Handelsblatt, in German (accessed 29 June 2009)
 bwcon, in German (accessed 4 November 2009)
 Fokus Online, in German (accessed 6 December 2009)

References

Businesspeople from Baden-Württemberg
1958 births
People from Pforzheim
Living people
Recipients of the Order of Merit of Baden-Württemberg